Microbacterium hominis is a bacterium from the genus Microbacterium which has been isolated from lung aspirate.

References

Further reading

External links
Type strain of Microbacterium hominis at BacDive -  the Bacterial Diversity Metadatabase	

Bacteria described in 1998
hominis